Chicken wing(s) or chickenwing may refer to:

 Chicken wings 
 Chicken wings as food
 Buffalo wing, a popular way of preparing chicken wings
Chicken Wing Song

Other 
Chicken wing, a defensive shot in pickleball
Chicken wing (catch wrestling), maneuver used in catch wrestling
Chicken Wings (comic), an aviation related comic by Michael and Stefan Strasser
Chickenwings, fictional character from X-Men

See also
Chicken lollipop
Chicken wing tackle, a move in Australian rules football and rugby league